The Richmond Royals are a Junior ice hockey team in Richmond, Ontario (later (Ottawa). Between 2014-15 and the end of the 2019-2020 seasons, the EOJHL and the CCHL set a new agreement  in an attempt to create a better player development model. This resulted in the league re-branding itself as the Central Canada Hockey League Tier 2 (CCHL2), and shrinking to 16 teams and two divisions. The league reverted to the Eastern Ontario Junior Hockey League for 2021.

History
During the summer of 2014, the Stittsville Minor Hockey Association announced a 3-year partnership with the Junior 'B' hockey team. The new agreement includes the previous Stittsville Royals changing their name to the Stittsville RAMS Junior Hockey Club and wearing the RAMS logo and colours.

In their first year of the new logo and colors the Stittsville Rams advanced to the league final.  Unfortunately they could not better the league defending champions, Casselman Vikings, dropping the series 2 games to four. During the final stages of the 2015–16 season the Minor Hockey association declared the affiliation terminated. The team completed the season as the Rams. During the off season the team changed ownership re-located and re-branded the team by returning to their roots as the Richmond Royals.

The addition of Embrun and Whitewater saw the league move the Royals from the Richardson to the Martin Division for the 2017–18 season.

Season-by-season results

External links
Royals Webpage
CCHL2 Webpage

Eastern Ontario Junior B Hockey League teams
Ice hockey teams in Ottawa
Ice hockey clubs established in 1968
1968 establishments in Ontario